Le Tour Eiffel is a live EP by Siouxsie, released in December 2007 on iTunes and also available on Amazon Digital Music. It is a digital download only release.

The songs were recorded in Paris on the first floor of Eiffel Tower ("La Tour Eiffel" in French) on 29 September 2007, during a private concert in front of 250-crowd of guests and competition winners. The ep contains live versions of  three songs from her Mantaray album: "About to Happen", "If It Doesn't Kill You", "Here Comes That Day" plus a cover version of the Doors' "Hello, I Love You". The live versions were later available on vinyl and cd on the b-sides of "About to Happen".

Track listing
"About to Happen" (Live In Paris)
"If It Doesn't Kill You" (Live In Paris) 
"Here Comes That Day" (Live In Paris)
"Hello, I Love You" (Live In Paris)

Personnel 
Steve Evans –  guitar
Charlie Jones –  bass and upright bass
Robert Brian –  drums 
Ted Benham –  percussion 
Amanda Kramer –  keyboards, synth
Gabriele Nicotra - sound engineer

References

2007 EPs
Siouxsie Sioux albums